Zac Alexander (born 11 February 1989) is a professional squash player who represented Australia. He reached a career-high world ranking of World No. 36 in September 2012 and has won a total of 26 PSA titles.

Zac won a gold medal at the 2018 Commonwealth Games on the Gold Coast teamed with David Palmer defeating Daryl Selby and Adrian Waller of England (11–9, 3-11, 11-6). In doubles Zac also won a Silver Medal at the World Doubles in Darwin in 2016 and a Gold Medal at the Malaysian Open Doubles Championships later the same year. This has been a very successful period for Zac who made the Australian doubles team for the 2014 Commonwealth Games in Glasgow but was forced to leave the games early.

In the lead up to the 2018 Commonwealth Games on the Gold Coast, Zac dominated squash tournaments for the 2016-2017 season in Australia:
 Winner Tasmanian Open 2016 (defeated Ko Youngjo (KOR) 3-0: 11-8, 11-1, 11-4)
 Winner NSW Squash Open 2016 (defeated Aaron Frankcomb (AUS) 3-0: 11-6, 11-7, 11-9)
 Winner North Coast Open 2016 (defeated Joshua Larkin (AUS)13-11 11-4 11-2)
 Winner Q Squash Ltd Queensland open 2016 (defeated Joshua Larkin (AUS) 3-1: 11-9, 6-11, 11-8, 11-7)
 Winner Mackay Open 2016 (defeated Manuel Wanner (SUI) 11-6, 11-8, 11-3)
 Winner Pacific Toyota Cairns Squash International 2016 (defeated Steven Finitis (AUS) 11-6, 11-4, 9-11, 11-7)
 Winner Pure Blonde Elanora Open 2017 (defeated Josh Larkin (AUS) 11-2, 11-6, 11-6)
 Winner Australian Closed Championships 2017 (defeated Rhys Dowling (AUS) 11-7, 11-2, 11-1).

References

External links 

 
 
 

1989 births
Living people
Australian male squash players
Commonwealth Games medallists in squash
Commonwealth Games gold medallists for Australia
Squash players at the 2018 Commonwealth Games
20th-century Australian people
21st-century Australian people
Medallists at the 2018 Commonwealth Games